Martha Gultom (born 1939) is an Indonesian former swimmer. She competed in the women's 100 metre backstroke at the 1956 Summer Olympics.

References

External links
 

1939 births
Living people
Indonesian female swimmers
Olympic swimmers of Indonesia
Swimmers at the 1956 Summer Olympics
Place of birth missing (living people)
Female backstroke swimmers